The 2018 Canadian Rugby Championship was the 10th season of the Canadian Rugby Championship. The competition took place between July 27 and August 26, 2018. The format for the 2018 season saw two double headed regional matches, followed by semi-finals and ranking finals.

The Ontario Blues beat the Atlantic Rock in the final; claiming their sixth Canadian Rugby Championship.

Teams
 Atlantic Rock
 Ontario Blues
 BC Bears
 Prairie Wolf Pack

Fixtures

Regional playoffs

Western Canada

BC Bears win 61–47 on aggregate

Eastern Canada

Ontario Blues win 44–43 on aggregate

Semifinals

3rd place

Final

See also 
Canadian Rugby Championship
Rugby Canada

References 

Canadian Rugby Championship
Canadian Rugby Championship seasons
CRC